Arthur Qwak (born as François Hemen, December 25, 1961) is a French animator and comic-book writer.

Filmography
Orson et Olivia (television series, 26 episodes)
Sonic Underground (television series, 14 episodes)
Malo Korrigan (television series. 26 episodes)
Dragon Hunters (television series. 26 episodes)
Dragon Hunters (2008 Movie)
Oscar's Oasis (television series, 72 episodes)

References

External links
 Personal site

See also
 Lola Cordova

1961 births
Living people
French cartoonists
French animators
French comics writers